Downfall is a 2004 German-language historical war drama film directed by Oliver Hirschbiegel from a screenplay by its producer, Bernd Eichinger. It is set during the Battle of Berlin in World War II, when Nazi Germany is on the verge of defeat, and depicts the final days of Adolf Hitler (portrayed by Bruno Ganz). The cast includes Alexandra Maria Lara, Corinna Harfouch, Ulrich Matthes, Juliane Köhler, Heino Ferch, Christian Berkel, Alexander Held, Matthias Habich, and Thomas Kretschmann. The film is a German-Austrian-Italian co-production.

Principal photography took place from September to November 2003, on location in Berlin, Munich, and in Saint Petersburg, Russia. As the film is set in and around the Führerbunker, Hirschbiegel used eyewitness accounts, survivors' memoirs, and other historical sources during production to reconstruct the look and atmosphere of 1940s Berlin. The screenplay was based on the books Inside Hitler's Bunker by historian Joachim Fest and Until the Final Hour by Traudl Junge, one of Hitler's secretaries, among other accounts of the period.

The film premiered at the Toronto Film Festival on 14 September 2004. It was controversial with audiences for showing a human side of Hitler, and for its portrayal of members of the Third Reich. It later received a wide theatrical release in Germany under its production company Constantin Film. The film grossed over $92million. Critics gave favourable reviews, particularly for Ganz's performance as Adolf Hitler and Eichinger's screenplay. It was nominated for Best Foreign Language Film at the 77th Academy Awards.

Plot
In November 1942, at the Wolf's Lair in East Prussia, Fuhrer of Nazi Germany Adolf Hitler invites a number of young women to interview for the position of his personal secretary. Traudl Junge is overjoyed when he chooses her. Two and a half years later, the Red Army has pushed Germany's forces back and surrounded Berlin. On Hitler's 56th birthday, the Red Army begins shelling Berlin's city centre. Reichsführer-SS Heinrich Himmler tries to persuade Hitler to leave Berlin, but Hitler refuses. Himmler leaves to negotiate terms with the Western Allies in secret. Later, Gruppenführer Hermann Fegelein, Himmler's adjutant, also attempts to persuade Hitler to flee, but Hitler insists that he will win or die in Berlin. SS doctor Obersturmbannführer Ernst-Günther Schenck is ordered to leave Berlin per Operation Clausewitz, though he persuades an SS general to let him stay in Berlin to treat the injured. In the streets, Hitler Youth child soldier Peter Kranz's father approaches his son's unit and tries to persuade him to leave. Peter, who destroyed two enemy tanks and will soon be awarded a medal by Hitler, calls his father a coward and runs away.

At a meeting in the Führerbunker, Hitler forbids the overwhelmed 9th Army from retreating, instead ordering Obergruppenführer Felix Steiner's units to mount a counter-attack. The generals find the orders impossible and irrational. Above ground, Hitler awards Peter his medal, hailing Peter as braver than his generals. In his office, Hitler talks to Minister of Armaments Albert Speer about his scorched earth policy. Speer is concerned about the destruction of Germany's infrastructure, but Hitler believes the German people left behind are weak and thus deserve death. Meanwhile, Hitler's companion Eva Braun holds a party in the Reich Chancellery. However, her brother-in-law Fegelein tries to persuade Eva to leave Berlin with Hitler, but she dismisses him. Artillery fire eventually breaks up the party.

On the battlefield, General Helmuth Weidling is informed he will be executed for allegedly ordering a retreat. Weidling comes to the Führerbunker to clear himself of his charges. His action impresses Hitler, who promotes him to oversee all of Berlin's defences. At another meeting, Hitler learns Steiner did not attack because his unit lacked sufficient force. Hitler becomes enraged at what he sees as an act of betrayal and launches into a furious tirade, shouting that everyone has failed him and denouncing his generals as cowards and traitors. He finally acknowledges that the war is lost, but that he would rather commit suicide than leave Berlin.

Schenck witnesses old men being executed by German military police for supposedly refusing to take part in the fighting. Hitler receives a message from Reichsmarschall Hermann Göring, requesting state leadership. Hitler declares Göring a traitor, ordering his dismissal from all posts and his arrest. Speer makes a final visit to the Führerbunker, and admits to Hitler that he has defied his orders to destroy Germany's infrastructure. Hitler, however, does not punish Speer, who decides to leave Berlin. Peter returns to find his unit dead and runs back to his parents. Hitler continues to imagine fantastic ways for Germany to turn the tide. At dinner, Hitler learns of Himmler's secret negotiations. Hearing that one of his most loyal followers has abandoned him sends him into another rage, and he quickly orders Himmler's execution. He also finds out that Fegelein has deserted his post, and has him executed despite Eva's pleas. SS physician Obergruppenführer Ernst-Robert Grawitz asks Hitler's permission to evacuate for fear of Allied reprisal. Hitler refuses, leading Grawitz to kill himself and his family.

The Soviets continue their advance, Berlin's supplies run low, and German morale plummets. Hitler hopes that the 12th Army, led by Lieutenant General Walther Wenck, will save Berlin. After midnight, Hitler dictates his last will and testament to Junge, before officially marrying Eva. The following morning, Hitler learns that the 12th Army is unable to relieve Berlin. Refusing surrender, Hitler plans his death. He administers poison to his dog Blondi, bids farewell to the bunker staff, and commits suicide with Eva. The two are crudely cremated with petrol in a ditch in the Chancellery garden.

Propaganda Minister Joseph Goebbels assumes the Chancellorship. General Hans Krebs fails to negotiate a conditional surrender with Soviet Marshal Vasily Chuikov. Goebbels declares that Germany will not surrender as long as he is alive. Goebbels' wife Magda poisons her six children with cyanide, before committing suicide with Goebbels; Weidling announces unconditional surrender of German forces in Berlin afterwards. Many government and military officials including Krebs commit suicide after learning of Germany's defeat. Peter discovers his parents were executed. Junge leaves the bunker and tries to flee the city; Peter joins her as she sneaks through a group of Soviet soldiers before the two find a bicycle and leave Berlin.

Cast

Officials and civilians

Wehrmacht

Schutzstaffel

Additional cast members in smaller roles include Alexander Slastin as Soviet Marshal Vasily Chuikov, Elena Dreyden as Inge Dombrowski, Norbert Heckner as Walter Wagner, Silke Nikowski as Frau Grawitz, Leopold von Buttlar as Sohn Grawitz, Veit Stübner as Tellermann, Boris Schwarzmann as Matvey Blanter, Vsevolod Tsurilo as Yevgeniy Dolmatovsky, Vasily Reutov as Weidling's chief of staff Theodor von Dufving. The Goebbels children are portrayed by Alina Sokar (Helga), Charlotte Stoiber (Hilda), Gregory Borlein (Helmut), Julia Bauer (Hedda), Laura Borlein (Holde), and Amelie Menges (Heide).

Production

Development
Producer and screenwriter Bernd Eichinger wanted to make a film about Adolf Hitler and the Nazi Party for twenty years but was, at first, discouraged after its enormity prevented him from doing so. Eichinger was inspired to begin the filmmaking process after reading Inside Hitler's Bunker: The Last Days of the Third Reich (2002) by historian Joachim Fest. Eichinger also based the film on the memoirs of Traudl Junge, one of Hitler's secretaries, called Until the Final Hour: Hitler's Last Secretary (2002). When writing the screenplay, he used the books Inside the Third Reich (1969), by Albert Speer, one of the highest-ranking Nazi officials to survive both the war and the Nuremberg trials; Hitler's Last Days: An Eye-Witness Account (1973), by Gerhard Boldt; Das Notlazarett unter der Reichskanzlei: Ein Arzt erlebt Hitlers Ende in Berlin (1995) by Ernst-Günther Schenck; and Soldat: Reflections of a German Soldier, 1936–1949 (1992) by Siegfried Knappe as references.

After completing the script for the film, Eichinger presented it to director Oliver Hirschbiegel. Though he was interested in exploring how the people of Germany "could have plumbed such depths", as a German, Hirschbiegel hesitated to take it as he "reacted to the idea of Nazism as a taboo". Hirschbiegel eventually agreed to helm the project.

Casting

When Bruno Ganz was offered the role of Hitler, he was reluctant to accept the part, and many of his friends advised against it, but he believed that the subject had "a fascinating side", and ultimately agreed to take the role.
Ganz conducted four months of research and studied a recording of Hitler in private conversation with Finnish Field Marshal Carl Gustaf Emil Mannerheim in order to properly mimic Hitler's conversational voice and Austrian dialect. Ganz came to the conclusion that Hitler had Parkinson's disease, noting his observation of Hitler's shaky body movements present in the newsreel Die Deutsche Wochenschau, and decided to visit a hospital to study patients with the disease. Ganz auditioned in the casting studio with makeup for half an hour and tested his voice for Hirschbiegel who was convinced by his performance.

Alexandra Maria Lara was cast as Traudl Junge; she was given Junge's book Until the Final Hour (2002), which she called her "personal treasure", to read during filming. Before she was cast, she had seen André Heller's documentary film Im toten Winkel which impressed her and influenced her perspective on Junge.

Filming and design

Principal photography lasted twelve weeks from September to November 2003, under the working title Sunset. The film is set mostly in and around the Führerbunker; Hirschbiegel made an effort to accurately reconstruct the look and atmosphere of World War II through eyewitness accounts, survivors' memoirs, and other historical sources. Hirschbiegel filmed in the cities of Berlin, Munich, and Saint Petersburg, Russia, with a run-down industrial district along the Obvodny Canal used to portray the historical setting in Berlin. Hirschbiegel noted the depressing atmosphere surrounding the shoot, finding relief through listening to Johann Sebastian Bach's music. Alexandra Maria Lara also mentioned the depressing and intense atmosphere during filming. To lighten the mood, Lara's colleagues engaged in activities such as football, while Ganz tried to keep a happy mood by retiring during shooting breaks.

The film was produced on a €13.5million budget. The bunker and Hitler's Wolf's Lair were constructed at Bavaria Studios in Munich by production designer Bernd Lepel. The damaged Reichstag building was depicted through the use of CGI. Hirschbiegel decided to limit the use of CGI, props and sets so as not to make the set design look like that of a theatre production, explaining:

Themes
According to Eichinger, the film's overlying idea was to make a film about Hitler and wartime Germany that was very close to historical truth, as part of a theme that would allow the German nation to save their own history and "experience their own trauma". To accomplish this, the film explores Hitler's decisions and motives during his final days through the perspective of the individuals who lived in the Führerbunker during those times. Eichinger chose not to include mention of the Holocaust because it was not the topic of the film. He also thought it was "impossible" to show the "misery" and "desperation" of the concentration camps cinematically.

Portrayal
During production, Hirschbiegel believed that Hitler would often charm people using his personality, only to manipulate and betray them. Many of the people in the film, including Traudl Junge, are shown to be enthusiastic in interacting with Hitler instead of feeling threatened or anxious by his presence and authority. The production team sought to give Hitler a three-dimensional personality, with Hirschbiegel telling NBC: "We know from all accounts that he was a very charming mana man who managed to seduce a whole people into barbarism." He said Hitler was "like a shell", attracting people with self-pity, but inside the shell was only "an enormous will for destruction".

The film explores the suicides and deaths of the Nazi Party as opposed to the people who choose life. Hitler's provision of cyanide pills to those in the bunker and the Goebbels' murder of their children are shown as selfish deeds while people such as Schenck, who choose to help the injured and escape death, are shown as rational and generous. In the DVD commentary, Hirschbiegel said that the events in the film were "derived from the accounts, from descriptions of people" in the bunker. The film also includes an introduction and closing with the real Junge in an interview from Im toten Winkel, where she admits feeling guilt for "not recognizing this monster in time".

Release
Downfall premiered at the Toronto Film Festival on September 14, 2004. After first failing to find a distributor, the film was eventually released on September 16 in Germany by Constantin Film. It premiered in the U.S. in Manhattan on February 18, 2005, under Newmarket Films. On its broadcast in the UK, Channel4 marketed it with the strapline: "It's a happy ending. He dies."

Box office and awards
Downfall sold nearly half a million tickets in Germany for its opening weekend and attracted 4.5 million viewers in the first three months. The final North American gross was $5,509,040, while $86,671,870 was made with its foreign gross. The film made $93.6million altogether.

Downfall was nominated for Best Foreign Language Film at the 77th Academy Awards. It won the 2005 BBC Four World Cinema competition. The film was also ranked number 48 in Empire magazine's "The 100 Best Films Of World Cinema" in 2010.

Home media
The film was released on DVD in 2005 by Columbia-TriStar Home Entertainment (now Sony Pictures Home Entertainment). Shout! Factory released a collector's edition Blu-ray in March 2018, with a "making-of" featurette, cast and crew interviews, and audio commentary from director Oliver Hirschbiegel.

Reception

Critical response
The review aggregation website Rotten Tomatoes gives the film a score of 90% based on 141 reviews from critics, with a weighted average of 8.00/10. The website's consensus reads, "Downfall is an illuminating, thoughtful and detailed account of Hitler's last days." On Metacritic, the film was awarded the "Must-See" badge, holding a weighted average of 82 out of 100 based on 35 reviews, indicating "universal acclaim".

Reviews for the film were often very positive, despite debate surrounding the film from critics and audiences upon its release . Ganz's portrayal of Hitler was singled out for praise; David Denby for The New Yorker said that Ganz "made the dictator into a plausible human being". Addressing other critics like Denby, Chicago Sun-Times critic Roger Ebert said the film did not provide an adequate portrayal of Hitler's actions, because he felt no film could, and that no response would be sufficient. Ebert said Hitler was, in reality, "the focus for a spontaneous uprising by many of the German people, fueled by racism, xenophobia, grandiosity and fear".

Hermann Graml, history professor and former Luftwaffe helper, praised the film and said that he had not seen a film that was "so insistent and tormentingly alive". Graml said that Hitler's portrayal was presented correctly by showing Hitler's will "to destroy, and his way of denying reality". Julia Radke of the German website Future Needs Remembrance praised the film's acting and called it well crafted and a solid Kammerspielfilm, though it could lose viewer interest due to a lack of concentration on the narrative perspective. German author Jens Jessen said that the film "could have been stupider" and called it a "chamber play that could not be staged undramatically". Jessen also said that it was not as spectacular as the pre-media coverage could have led one to believe, and it did not arouse the "morbid fascination" the magazine Der Spiegel was looking for.

Hitler biographer Sir Ian Kershaw wrote in The Guardian that the film had enormous emotive power, calling it a triumph and "a marvellous historical drama". Kershaw also said that he found it hard to imagine anyone would find Hitler to be a sympathetic figure in his final days. Wim Wenders, in a review for the German newspaper Die Zeit, said the film was absent of a strong point of view for Hitler which made him harmless, and compared Downfall to Resident Evil: Apocalypse, stating that in Resident Evil the viewer would know which character was evil.

Controversy

Downfall was the subject of dispute by critics and audiences in Germany before and after its release, with many concerned regarding Hitler's portrayal in the film as a human being with emotions in spite of his actions and ideologies. The portrayal sparked debate in Germany due to publicity from commentators, film magazines, and newspapers, leading the German tabloid Bild to ask the question, "Are we allowed to show the monster as a human being?"

It was criticized for its scenes involving the members of the Nazi party, with author Giles MacDonogh criticizing the portrayals as being sympathetic towards SS officers Wilhelm Mohnke and Ernst-Günther Schenck, the former of whom was accused of murdering a group of British prisoners of war in the Wormhoudt massacre. But at a discussion in London, Hirschbiegel said in response that he did not find the allegations against Schenck convincing. The film was also seen as controversial because it was made by Germans instead of British or American filmmakers. Russian press visited the set, making the producers uneasy and occasionally defensive. Yana Bezhanskay, director of Globus Film, Constantin's Russian partner, raised her voice to Russian journalists and said: "This is an antifascist film and nowhere in it do you see Hitler praised."

Cristina Nord from Die Tageszeitung criticized the portrayal, and said that though it was important to make films about perpetrators, "seeing Hitler cry" had not informed her on the last days of the Third Reich. Some have supported the film: Hans-Jürgen Syberberg, director of Hitler: A Film from Germany, felt the time was right to "paint a realistic portrait" of Hitler. Eichinger replied to the response from the film by stating that the "terrifying thing" about Hitler was that he was human and "not an elephant or a monster from Mars". Ganz said that he was proud of the film; though he said people had accused him of "humanizing" Hitler.

Internet parodies

Downfall is well known for its rise in popularity due to many "Hitler Rants" internet parody videos which use several scenes in the film: where Hitler becomes angry after hearing that Steiner's attack never happened, due to a lack of forces; when Hitler hears Luftwaffe commander Hermann Göring's telegram; when Hitler phones General der Flieger Karl Koller about Berlin's April 20 bombings; when Hitler is having dinner and discovers Reichsführer-SS Heinrich Himmler secretly made a surrender offer to the Western Allies; where Hitler orders Otto Günsche to find SS-Gruppenführer Hermann Fegelein; and when Hitler discusses a counterattack against advancing Soviet forces with his generals. In the videos the original German audio is retained, but new subtitles are added so that Hitler and his subordinates seem to be reacting to an issue or setback in present-day politics, sports, entertainment, popular culture, or everyday life. In addition, some users combine footage from the film with other sources, dub the German dialogue over video games and/or footage from other films and TV series, or edit images of the characters onto pre-existing or animated footage, often for greater comic effect.

Hirschbiegel spoke positively about these parodies in a 2010 interview with New York magazine, saying that many of them were funny and a fitting extension of the film's purpose. Nevertheless, Constantin Film asked video sites to remove them. The producers initiated a removal of parody videos from YouTube in 2010. This prompted more posting of parody videos of Hitler complaining that the parodies were being taken down, and a resurgence of the videos on the site.

See also
Adolf Hitler in popular culture
Vorbunker
The Bunker – 1981 English language TV movie that broadly depicts the same events starring Anthony Hopkins as Adolf Hitler

References
Informational notes

Citations

Bibliography

Further reading
 (studies about the Film)

O'Donnell, James P (2001) [1978]. The Bunker: The History of the Reich Chancellery Group, Boston: Houghton Mifflin, .

External links

2004 films
2004 controversies
2005 controversies
2004 biographical drama films
2000s historical films
2000s war drama films
Austrian historical films
Austrian war drama films
German historical films
German war drama films
Italian historical films
Italian war drama films
2000s German-language films
2000s Russian-language films
Anti-war films about World War II
Films about suicide
Drama films based on actual events
Films based on biographies
Films based on non-fiction books
Films about the Battle of Berlin
Films set in the 1940s
Films shot in Berlin
Films shot in Germany
Films shot in Russia
Cultural depictions of Eva Braun
Cultural depictions of Joseph Goebbels
Cultural depictions of Hermann Göring
Cultural depictions of Heinrich Himmler
Cultural depictions of Albert Speer
Political Internet memes
2000s survival films
Viral videos
World War II films based on actual events
War epic films
Newmarket Capital Group films
Films about Adolf Hitler
Films directed by Oliver Hirschbiegel
Films produced by Bernd Eichinger
Films with screenplays by Bernd Eichinger
Films based on multiple works
Death of Adolf Hitler
Internet memes introduced in 2006
Film and television memes
Film controversies
Film controversies in Germany
Casting controversies in film
Political controversies in film
2004 drama films
German World War II films
Italian World War II films
Austrian World War II films
2000s German films
Films set in bunkers